Le Bon et les Méchants is a French film directed by Claude Lelouch and released in 1976.

Synopsis
From 1935 to 1945, the happiness of a couple turns to sadness when their  Traction Avant is used by the gang des Tractions Avant.

Details
Director: Claude Lelouch
Musique : Francis Lai, songs by Jacques Dutronc
Length: 120 minutes
Release date: 19 January 1976

Starring

Jacques Dutronc : Jacques
Marlène Jobert : Lola
Jacques Villeret : Simon
Bruno Cremer : L'inspecteur Bruno Deschamps
Brigitte Fossey : Dominique Blanchot
Jean-Pierre Kalfon : Henri Lafont
Alain Mottet : commissaire Blanchot
Marie Déa : Mme Blanchot
Serge Reggiani : chef de la Résistance
Stéphane Bouy : Bony
  Georg Marischka  : général allemand
Philippe Léotard : vendeur de Citroën
Alain Basnier : fils Blanchot
Valérie Lagrange : Françoise
 Claudio Gaia : Claudio De Souza
 Arlette Emmery : Arlette
 Anne Libert : sa copine
 Étienne Chicot : Lieutenant
  Hans Verner : officier allemand
  Oskar Freitag : allemand
  Otto Frieber : allemand
  Michel Fortin : truand
  Jean Luisi : truand
  Michel Charrel : truand
  André Falcon : maire
  Michel Peyrelon : présentateur du défilé de mode
  Gérard Dournel  : supérieur
José Luis de Vilallonga : homme du couple dévalisé
  Mme de Vilallonga : femme du couple dévalisé
  Jean Mermet : vendeur de traction
  Adrien Cayla-Legrand : Charles De Gaulle
  Gérard Sire : voix narrateur/commentateur actualités/speaker radio (non crédité)
  Tony Roedel : officier allemand (non crédité)
Jean Bessière
  Roland Neunreuther : cascadeur.

Details 
 The film is projected in sepia.

External links

1970s French films
1976 films
Fictional couples
Films directed by Claude Lelouch
Films scored by Francis Lai
French crime drama films